Shiramba Kamuy is the Ainu kamuy (god) of wood, grains, and other forms of vegetation.  He is therefore also the kamuy of many household tools, which contain wood.  He is sometimes portrayed as the brother of Hash-inau-uk Kamuy, the goddess of the hunt.

References

Ashkenazy, Michael. Handbook of Japanese Mythology. Santa Barbara, California: ABC-Clio, 2003.
Etter, Carl. Ainu Folklore: Traditions and Culture of the Vanishing Aborigines of Japan. Chicago: Wilcox and Follett, 1949.
Munro, Neil Gordon. Ainu Creed and Cult. New York: Columbia University Press, 1995.

Ainu kamuy
Nature gods